Leadstart (One Point Six Technologies Pvt. Ltd.) is a Traditional, media-tech publishing house, distributor and rights agency platform based in Mumbai, India.

History 

Leadstart has published books by authors like Anand Neelakantan, Sapan Saxena, Rashmi Narzary, and Sabarna Roy amongst others. Over the years, the publisher has released several books that have gone to become national and international bestsellers- like Asura, Ajaya: Roll of the Dice, Ajaya: Rise of Kali, The Iron Tooth, Etcetera. The publishing house has collaborated with authors who have won titles and awards like Padma Bhushan, Sahitya Akademi, Man Asian Literary Prize and Crossword Book Award amongst other.

Publications 
 
 
 A Maverick Heart (2013)

References 

Book publishing companies of India